The Eyalet of Childir or Akhalzik was an eyalet of the Ottoman Empire in the Southwestern Caucasus. The area of the former Çıldır Eyalet is now divided between Samtskhe-Javakheti and the Autonomous Republic of Adjara in Georgia and provinces of Artvin, Ardahan and Erzurum in Turkey. The administrative center was Çıldır between 1578 and 1628, Ahıska between 1628 and 1829, and Oltu between 1829 and 1845.

History
Samtskhe was the only Georgian principality to permanently become an Ottoman province (as the eyalet of Cildir). In the eighty years after the battle of Zivin the region was gradually absorbed into the empire.

The Ottomans took the Ahıska region from the Principality of Meskheti, a vassal state of Safavid dynasty. In 1578, when the new province was established, they appointed the former Georgian prince, Minuchir (who took the name of Mustafa after converting to Islam) as the first governor. This eyalet expanded after taking of Ottomans Adjara region from Principality of Guria in 1582. From 1625 onwards the entire eyalet was a hereditary possession of the now-Muslim atabegs of Samtskhe, which administered it as hereditary governors, with some exceptions, until the mid-18th century.

During the Russo-Turkish War (1828–1829), Russians occupied much of the province. The administrative centre was moved from Akhaltsikhe, which was ceded to Russia, to Oltu.

By the treaty of Adrianople, much of the pashalik was ceded to Russia, and became part of the Russian Akhalzik uzeyd of Kutaisi Governorate. The remaining, smaller inner part was united with the eyalet of Kars (later part of Eyalet of Erzurum) in 1845 and coastal parts was united with Trabzon Eyalet in 1829.

Governors
 1579 - 1582: Manuchar II Jaqeli (Mustafa Pasha) 
 1582 - 1585: Hüsrev Pasha
 1585 - c.1596: Ahmed Pasha
 c.1596 - 1603: Hızır Pasha
 1603 - 1614: Karakash Ahmed Pasha
 1614 - 1625: Manuchar III Jaqeli (son of Manuchar II)
 1625 - 1635: Beka III Jaqeli (Sefer Pasha, brother of Manuchar II)
 1635 - 1647: Yusuf Pasha (son of Sefer Pasha)
 1647 - 1659: Rüstem Pasha (son of Yusuf Pasha)
 1659 - 1679: Arslan Mehmed Pasha (son of Yusuf Pasha)
 1679 - 1690: Yusuf II (son of Arslan)
 1690 - 1701: Selim Pasha (son of Arslan)
 1701 - 1722: Ishak Pasha (son of Yusuf II)
 1722 - 1725: Şehsuvarzade Mehmed Pasha
 1725 - 1732: Ishak Pasha (again)
 1732 - 1744: Yusuf III (son of Ishak)
 1744 - 1748: Ishak Pasha (again)
 1748 - 1759: Haji Ahmed Pasha (son of Ishak)
 29 December 1759 - 24 January 1761: Vezir Ibrahim Pasha
 25 January 1761 - 9 March 1767: Hasan Pasha (son of Yusuf III)
 10 March 1767 - 27 October 1767: Silahdar İbrahim Bey
 28 October 1767 - 24 June 1770: Vezir Seyyid Numan Pasha
 25 June 1770 - 4 January 1771: Vezir Mehmed Pasha
 5 January 1771 - 18 January 1790: Suleyman Pasha (grandson of Ishak Pasha)
 9 April 1791 - 10 August 1792: Ishak II, who oversaw the completion of the Ishak Pasha Palace (son of Hasan Pasha)
 11 August 1792 - 21 July 1796: Mehmed Şerif Pasha (son of Suleyman Pasha)
 22 July 1796 - 13 January 1797: Kör Yusuf Ziyaüddin Pasha
 14 January 1797 - 1801: Mehmet Sabit Pasha (son of Hasan Pasha)
 1801 - 1 November 1802: Mehmed Şerif Pasha (again)
 1802 - 1809: Selim Khimshiashvili (Selim Pasha)
 1810 - 1811: Mehmed Şerif Pasha (again)
 1811 - June 1815: Selim Pasha (again)
 3 September 1816 - 25 April 1818: Lütfullah Pasha 
 26 April 1818 - March 1821: Benderli Ali Pasha
 March 1821 - April 1824: Seyyid Ahmed Pasha
 April 1824 - 14 February 1825: Haji Salih Pasha
 15 February 1825 - 1829: Kadirzade Osman Pasha

Administrative divisions
Sanjaks of the Eyalet in the 17th century:
 Sanjak of Oulti (Oltu)
 Sanjak of Harbus
 Sanjak of Ardinj (Ardanuç)
 Sanjak of Hajrek (Hanak)
 Sanjak of Great Ardehan
 Sanjak of Postkhu
 Sanjak of Mahjil (Macahel)
 Sanjak of Ijareh penbek

Hereditary sanjaks:
 Sanjak of Purtekrek (Yusufeli)
 Sanjak of Lawaneh (Livane/Artvin)
 Sanjak of Nusuf Awan
 Sanjak of Shushad (Şavşat)

See also
 Jaqeli
 Meskhetian Turks

Notes

References

Eyalets of the Ottoman Empire in Anatolia
Ottoman period in Georgia (country)
History of Adjara
History of Ardahan Province
History of Artvin Province
History of Erzurum Province
1578 establishments in the Ottoman Empire
1845 disestablishments in the Ottoman Empire